Mkasi (Swahili for scissors) is a Tanzanian television talk show.

Format
The show takes place at the Amaya Beauty Salon and Spa and in the show Salama Jabir and his friends gets to sit down with celebrities and interview them

Episodes

Season 1

Season 2

Season 3

Season 4

Season 5

Season 6

Season 6 New

Season 7

Season 8

Season 9

Season 10

Season 11

Awards and Nomination

Tanzania People's Choice Awards

|-
|2014
|Mkasi
|Favorite TV show
|
|-
|2015
|Mkasi
|Favorite TV show
|
|-
|}

References

External links
 
 Online episodes

Tanzanian television series
Tanzanian television talk shows
2011 television series debuts